St. Mary of the Annunciation  Roman Catholic Church is a historic church of the Roman Catholic Diocese of Columbus in Portsmouth, Ohio. It was built in 1870 and added to the National Register of Historic Places in 1979.

History 
The first Church of the Annunciation of Portsmouth was built in 1844 by Father O. Mealy, on Madison and 3rd Street. However, by 1852, the Catholics of the community needed another parish, and the German Catholics of the area retained the Church of the Annunciation, under the leadership of Father Francis Karge. The German community grew such that plans were made to construct a new church. A lot on the corner of Fifth and Market was purchased for $2500 in 1859 and the foundation of the church was built  in 1864, in addition to a large schoolhouse, costing $3000. The cornerstone of the current church was blessed by Bishop Sylvester Rosecrans on May 9, 1869. The building was dedicated under the name of "Annunciation" on July 31, 1870, having cost $70,000. In 1877, a large pipe organ was added, and in 1895, a bell tower and chimes were installed.

As of 2022, the church is part of the Scioto Catholic parish consortium along with Holy Redeemer, Holy Trinity, and Saint Peter churches.

References

External links

Roman Catholic churches completed in 1870
Churches in the Roman Catholic Diocese of Columbus
Churches on the National Register of Historic Places in Ohio
National Register of Historic Places in Scioto County, Ohio
Churches in Portsmouth, Ohio
19th-century Roman Catholic church buildings in the United States